Facing the Modern: The Portrait in Vienna 1900 was an exhibition at the National Gallery, London, running from 9 October 2013 through to 12 January 2014.

Description 

The exhibition was curated by Gemma Blackshaw and sponsored by Credit Suisse.

Exhibition catalogue 

The exhibition catalogue was entitled Facing the Modern: The Portrait in Vienna 1900. It is edited by Gemma Blackshaw and has an introduction by Edmund de Waal. Contributors are:

 Gemma Blackshaw (On Stage: The New Viennese; Past Times and Present Anxieties at the Galerie Miethke; Klimt, Schiele and Schonberg: Self Portraits).
 Tag Gronberg (Biedermeir Modern: representing Family Values).
 Doris H. Lehmann (Portraying Viennese Beauty: Makart and Klimt).
 Julie M. Johnson (Woman Artists and Portraiture in Vienna 1900).
 Elana Shapira (Imaging the Jew: A Clash of Civilisations).
 Sabine Wieber (A Beautiful Corpse: Vienna's Fascination with Death).

Introduction 

Edmund de Waal is the author of The Hare with Amber Eyes, which tells the story of his family, the wealthy Jewish Ephrussi family, who settled in Vienna towards the end of the 19th century. One of the first things they did to establish themselves was to commission portraits. The exhibition catalogue explores the way in which portraiture in Vienna was intertwined with patronage, politics and the creation of taste. Included in the exhibition (exhibit no. 73) is an Ephrussi family photograph album, dating from about 1904, depicting members of the family in tableaux vivants.

On stage: the new Viennese 

Gustav Klimt's Auditorium in the Old Burgtheater contains one hundred and thirty-one minutely realised portraits of the upper echelons of Viennese society at the time, and as such has been characterised as a portrait of the late 19th century. But it also an image of the emerging middle classes that most defined that century. The catalogue takes as its subject this new class, the Neu-Wiener (New Viennese), and retells the story of the modern portrait as its story.

Past times and present anxieties at the Galerie Miethke 

The Galerie Miethke was one of Vienna's most progressive galleries. Yet in 1905 it devoted an exhibition to portraits of the early nineteenth century, the Alt-Wiener (Old Viennese), reflecting the anxieties of the age in seeking comfort from the past. Neu-Wiener (New Viennese) portraits such as Anton Romako's Portrait of Isabella Reisser reflect a new psychologism.

Biedermeier modern: representing family values 

Tag Gronberg surveys the portrayal of family values over an extended 19th century ranging from the early 1800s to the First World War. In Fin-de-siècle Vienna it was still possible to see nostalgic portrayals of family life in the Biedermeier tradition of the first half of the century. But in the age of Freud such depictions of harmonious domesticity no longer went unchallenged and by 1918 portraits such as Egon Schiele's The Family posed stark challenges to the viewer.

Portraying Viennese beauty: Makart and Klimt 

Hans Makart was the dominant portraitist in the Ringstrasse period (1857–1914). His portraits were primarily of young women from the upper middle classes and the lower ranks of the nobility, an upwardly mobile group of patrons anxious to legitimise their status in a rigidly hierarchical and traditional monarchical system. By Gustav Klimt's time, ideals of beauty had changed. Klimt incorporated design principles in his portraits that he had developed in his other works. In his later work the application of color increased dramatically, in response to the advent of Fauvism.

Klimt, Schiele, and Schönberg: Self Portraits 

Gustav Klimt completed just one self-portrait during his 40-year career, declaring himself uninterested in himself as a subject for a painting. Egon Schiele on the other hand portrayed himself frequently, using his body as a medium of expression, approaching it as just another material to be manipulated. Schönberg was an untrained artist, "in many ways the archetypal artist-genius" in the Romantic tradition of the anxious and alienated artist, as represented in self-portraits by Friedrich von Amerling, Franz Eybl, and the young Rudolf von Alt.

Woman Artists and Portraiture in Vienna 1900 

Julie M. Johnson discusses the lives and work of Broncia Koller-Pinell, Elena Luksch-Makowsky, and Teresa Ries. Woman artists in Fin-de-siècle Vienna, many of whom were Jewish, laboured under misogyny and restrictions, but nevertheless were able to pursue careers as public artists, to sustain studios, and to mount spectacular exhibitions.

Imaging the Jew: a clash of civilisations 

Elana Shapira examines the portraiture of Gustav Klimt, Oskar Kokoschka, Richard Gerstl, and Arnold Schönberg.  In portraying their Jewish sitters, Klimt and Kokoschka sought to create a shared cultural platform between Jews and Christians while Gerstl and Schönberg sought to expose the problems behind that artistic aim.

A Beautiful Corpse: Vienna's Fascination with Death 

Fin-de-siècle Vienna's fascination with death and dying may have been the result of a deep-rooted cultural pessimism, but it had positive affirmation as well in its tradition of a schöne Leiche, or  beautiful corpse. When Gustav Klimt was called upon to paint a deathbed portrait of Ria Munk, a suicide scandalously involved with the novelist Hanns Heinz Ewers, he first portrayed her as a sleeping beauty. Her mother Aranka rejected this, as well as a subsequent version portraying her as a bare-breasted exotic dancer, leading Klimt to his celebrated, unfinished, Posthumous Portrait of Ria Munk III. The painting was seized by the Nazis and eventually restituted to the heirs of Aranka Munk in 2009, fetching £18,801,250 at auction in 2010.

Illustrative works

List of artists exhibited 

Works from the following artist are exhibited:

List of exhibited works 

The following works are exhibited:
  Gustav Klimt (1862–1918) Portrait of Hermine Gallia, 1904, oil on canvas, 170.5 × 96.5 cm, National Gallery, London (NG 6434).
 Oskar Kokoschka (1886–1980), Portrait of Lotte Franzos, 1909, oil on canvas, 114.9 × 79.4 cm, The Phillips Collection, Washington, D.C. (1062).
 Hans Canon (1829–1885) Girl with Parrot, 1876, oil on canvas, 126 × 84.6 cm, Belvedere, Vienna (5943).
 Egon Schiele (1890–1918), Portrait of Erich Lederer, 1913, oil and gouache on canvas, 140 × 55.4 cm, Kunstmuseum, Basel (G 1986.16).
 Oskar Kokoschka (1886–1980), Portrait of Hugo Schmidt, 1911, oil on canvas, 72.5 × 54 cm, private collection.
 Oskar Kokoschka (1886–1980), Portrait of Max Schmidt, 1914, oil on canvas, 90 × 57.7 cm, Museo Thyssen-Bornemisza, Madrid (1982.29 (629)).
 Oskar Kokoschka (1886–1980), Portrait of Carl Leo Schmidt, 1911, oil on canvas, 97.2 × 67.8 cm, Museo Thyssen-Bornemisza, Madrid (CTB.1998.27).
 Friedrich von Amerling (1803–1887), Emperor Franz I of Austria, Study for the Official Portrait of 1832 1832, oil on canvas, 29.9 × 21.8 cm, Cartin Collection, USA.
 Friedrich von Amerling (1803–1887), Portrait of Franz Xaver Stöber, 1837, oil on canvas, 41 × 33 cm, Liechtenstein. The Princely Collections (GE 2147).
 Carl Moll (1861–1945), Self Portrait in his Study, 1906, oil on canvas, 100 × 100 cm, Gemäldegalerie der Akademie der bildenden Künste Wien, Vienna (GG-1338).
 Ferdinand Georg Waldmüller (1793–1865), Portrait of Militia Company Commander Schaumberg and his Child, 1846, oil on oak, 31.8 × 26.2 cm, Gemäldegalerie der Akademie der bildenden Künste Wien, Vienna (GG-1155).
 Ferdinand Georg Waldmüller (1793–1865), Portrait of Schaumberg's Wife, 1846, oil on oak, 31 × 25.6 cm, Gemäldegalerie der Akademie der bildenden Künste Wien, Vienna (GG-1156).
 Leopold Carl Müller (1834–1892), Portrait of Victor Tilgner, about 1899, oil on canvas, 95 × 68 cm, Gemäldegalerie der Akademie der bildenden Künste Wien, Vienna (GG-1223).
 Max Oppenheimer (1885–1954), Portrait of Heinrich Mann, 1910, oil on canvas, 91 × 81 cm, Wien Museum, Vienna (78913).
 Anton Romako (1832–1889), Portrait of Isabella Reisser, 1885, oil on canvas, 130.5 × 90 cm, Leopold Museum Private Foundation, Vienna (LM 2116).
 Anton Romako (1832–1889), Portrait of Christoph Reisser, 1885, oil on canvas, 130.5 × 90.5 cm, Leopold Museum Private Foundation, Vienna (LM 2117).
 Richard Gerstl (1883–1908), Portrait of Lieutenant Alois Gerstl, 1907, oil on canvas, 153 × 130.2 cm, Leopold Museum Private Foundation, Vienna (LM 639).
 Arnold Schönberg (1874–1951), Portrait of Hugo Botstiber, before October 1910, oil on cardboard, 73 × 50 cm, private collection, Vienna.
 Josef Maria Auchentaller (1865–1949), Bunte Bände (Portrait of Maria), 1912, oil on canvas, 120 × 110.5 cm, Archivio Auchentaller, Italy.
 Ferdinand Georg Waldmüller (1793–1865), Portrait of an Unidentified Seated Girl in a White Satin Dress, oil on canvas, 32 × 26.5 cm, 1839, Wien Museum, Vienna.
 Gustav Klimt (1862–1918), Young Girl, Seated, 1894, oil on wood, 14 × 9.6 cm, Leopold Museum Private Foundation, Vienna (LM 4146).
 Josef Maria Auchentaller (1865–1949), Portrait of Maria, oil on canvas, 30.5 × 25.5 cm, 1896, Archivio Auchentaller, Italy.
 Anton Romako (1832–1889), The Artist's Nieces, Elisabeth and Maja, 1873, oil on canvas, 93.2 × 79.6 cm, Belvedere, Vienna (8557).
 Richard Gerstl (1883–1908), The Sisters Karoline and Pauline Fey, 1905, oil on canvas, 175 × 150 cm, Belvedere, Vienna (4430).
 Alois Delug (1859–1930), The Markl Family, 1907, oil on canvas, 113.5 × 138 cm, Belvedere, Vienna (1425).
 Anton Kolig (1886–1950), Portrait of the Schaukal Family, 1911, oil on canvas, 160 × 160 cm, Leopold Collection II.
 Egon Schiele (1890–1918), The Family (Self Portrait), oil on canvas, 150 × 160.8 cm, 1918, Belvedere, Vienna (4277).
 Hans Makart (1840–1884), Portrait of Hanna Klinkosch, about 1875, oil on wood, 114 × 77 cm, Austrian collection.
 Hans Makart (1840–1884), Portrait of Clothilde Beer, about 1878, oil on canvas, 135.3 × 95.6 cm, Salzburg Museum (365–42).
 Gustav Klimt (1862–1918), Portrait of a Lady in Black, about 1894, oil on canvas, 155 × 75 cm, private collection.
 Gustav Klimt (1862–1918), Study for the Portrait of Amalie Zuckerlandl, 1913–14, pencil on paper, 56.9 × 37.5 cm, Albertina, Vienna (30249).
 Gustav Klimt (1862–1918), Study for the Portrait of Amalie Zuckerlandl, 1913–14, pencil on paper, 56.9 × 37.5 cm, private collection.
 Gustav Klimt (1862–1918), Portrait of Amalie Zuckerlandl, 1917–18, oil on canvas, 128 × 128 cm, Belvedere, Vienna (7700).
 Albert Paris von Gütersloh (1887–1973), Portrait of a Woman, 1914, oil on canvas, 54.6 × 38.5 cm, Leopald Museum Private Foundation (LM 81)
 Anselm Feuerbach (1829–1880), Self Portrait with Cigarette, 1875, oil on canvas, 66 × 52.5 cm, Staatsgalerie Stuttgart L900.
 Egon Schiele (1890–1918), Self Portrait with Raised Bare Shoulder, 1912, oil on wood, 42.2 × 33.9 cm, Leopald Museum Private Foundation (LM 653)
 Egon Schiele (1890–1918), Portrait of Albert Paris von Gütersloh, 1918, oil on canvas, 140 × 110.3 cm, Minneapolis Institute of Arts (54.30).
 Friedrich von Amerling (1803–1887), Self Portrait, 1867, oil on oak, 82 × 62 cm, Gemäldegalerie der Akademie der bildenden Künste Wien, Vienna (GG-945).
 Arnold Schönberg (1874–1951), Blue Self Portrait, 1910, oil on canvas, 31.1 × 22.9 cm, Schönberg Center, Vienna (CR 11).
 Franz Eybl (1806–1880), Self Portrait, about 1840, oil on canvas, 70 × 55.5 cm, Gemäldegalerie der Akademie der bildenden Künste Wien, Vienna (GG-1149).
 Rudolf von Alt (1812–1905), Self Portrait, about 1835, watercolor, 18.3 × 13.3 cm, Gemäldegalerie der Akademie der bildenden Künste Wien, Vienna (116761/2).
 Rudolf von Alt (1812–1905), Self Portrait, 1883, pencil and watercolor, 35.5 × 25.5 cm, Albertina, Vienna (30999)
 Arnold Schönberg (1874–1951), Portrait of Marietta Werndorff, before October 1910, oil on board, 99.7 × 71 cm, Schönberg Center, Vienna (CR 88).
 Arnold Schönberg (1874–1951), Portrait of Georg Schönberg, February 1910, oil on three-ply panel, 50 × 47 cm, Schönberg Center, Vienna (CR 98).
Broncia Koller (1863–1934), Nude Portrait of Marietta, 1907, oil on canvas, 107.5 × 148.5 cm, Eisenberger Collection, Vienna.
Broncia Koller (1863–1934), Silvia Koller with a Birdcage, 1907-8, oil on canvas, 100 × 100 cm, Eisenberger Collection, Vienna.
Oskar Kokoschka (1886–1980), Children Playing, 1909, oil on canvas, 72 × 108 cm, Lehmbruck Museum, Duisburg (573/1965).
 Teresa Ries (1874–1956), Self Portrait, 1902, oil on canvas, 157 × 70.5 cm, Wien Museum, Vienna (133781).
 Richard Gerstl (1883–1908), Nude Self Portrait with Palette, 1908, oil on canvas, 139.3 × 100 cm, Leopold Museum Private Foundation, Vienna (LM 651).
 Elena Luksch-Makowsky (1878–1967), Self Portrait with her Son Peter, 1901, oil on canvas, 94.5 × 52 cm, Belvedere, Vienna (7455).
 Friedrich von Amerling (1803–1887), Portrait of Cäcilie Freiin von Eskeles, 1832, oil on canvas, 151.5 × 102 cm, Germanisches Nationalmuseum, Nuremberg (GM 913).
 Isidor Kaufmann (1854–1921), Young Rabbi from N., about 1910, oil on wood, 38.1 × 27.6 cm, Tate, London (N04464).
 Oskar Kokoschka (1886–1980), Count Verona, 1910, oil on canvas, 70.6 × 58.7 cm, private collection, Hong Kong.
 Oskar Kokoschka (1886–1980), Portrait of Peter Altenberg, 1909, oil on canvas, 76.2 × 71.1 cm, private collection.
 Oskar Kokoschka (1886–1980), Portrait of Hanz Tietze and Erica Tietze-Conrat, 1909, oil on canvas, 76.5 × 136.2 cm, The Museum of Modern Art, New York (651.1939).
 Richard Gerstl (1883–1908), Portrait of Alexander Zemlinsky, 1908, oil on canvas, 170.5 × 74.3 cm, Kamm Collection (K.G. 78a) REVERSE Fragment of a Full-length Self Portrait, about 1904, oil on canvas, 170.5 × 74.3 cm, Kamm Collection (K.G. 78b).
 Richard Gerstl (1883–1908), Portrait of Mathilde Schönberg in the Studio, after February 1908, oil on canvas, 171 × 60 cm, Kamm Collection (K.G. 77).
 Franz von Matsch (1861–1942), Emperor Franz Joseph on his Deathbed, 1916, oil on card, 51.5 × 69.5 cm, Belvedere, Vienna (3300).
 Franz Eybl (1806–1880), The Artist Franz Wipplinger, looking at a Portrait of his Late Sister, 1833, oil on canvas,126 × 100 cm, Belvedere, Vienna (1869).
 Friedrich von Amerling (1803–1887), Antonie von Amerling on her Deathbed, 1843, oil on canvas, 47 × 39 cm, Wien Museum, Vienna.
 Gyula Benczúr (1844–1920), Portrait of Empress Elisabeth, 1899, oil on canvas, 142 × 95 cm, Hungarian National Museum, Budapest (1861).
 Gustav Klimt (1862–1918), Ria Munk on her Deathbed, 1912, oil on canvas, 50 × 50.5 cm, private collection.
 Gustav Klimt (1862–1918), Posthumous Portrait of Ria Munk III, 1917–18, oil on canvas, 180.7 × 89.8 cm, private collection.
 Egon Schiele (1890–1918), Portrait of Edith Schiele, dying, 28 October 1918, Black chalk on paper, 44 × 29.5 cm, Leopold Museum, Vienna (LM 2382).
 Otto Zimmermann, 1902, photographed by Studio S. Fleck, photograph, 10.2 × 16.5 cm, Diethard Leopold Collection, Vienna.
 Gustav Klimt (1862–1918), Portrait of the Artist's Dead Son, Otto Zimmermann, 1902, chalk on paper, 39.5 × 24.7 cm, Diethard Leopold Collection, Vienna.
 Moriz Schroth (dates unknown), Death Mask of Gustav Klimt, 1918, plaster, 27 × 21 × 18 cm, Wien Museum, Vienna (43945).
 Unknown artist, Death Mask of Egon Schiele, 1918, plaster, 19.5 × 15.5 cm, Wien Museum, Vienna (95170).
 Josef Humplik (1888–1958), Death Mask of Adolf Loos, 1933, plaster, 24 × 18.5 × 17 cm, Wien Museum, Vienna (78988).
 Carl Moll (1861–1945), Death Mask of Gustav Mahler, 1911, plaster, 35 × 29 × 16 cm, Wien Museum, Vienna (78658/b).
 Josef Danhauser (1805–1845) and Matthias Ranftl (1804–1854), Death Mask of Beethoven, 1827, plaster, 25 × 17 × 15 cm, Wien Museum, Vienna (95323).
 Josef Danhauser (1805–1845), Beethoven's Hands, 1827, oil on canvas, 10.2 × 16.5 cm, Beethoven-Haus, Bonn, Collection H.C. Bodmer (B 952).
 Unknown, Emmy von Ephrussi's photograph album, about 1904, book open 24 × 34 cm, Edmund de Waal.

Reviews 
Praise was generally somewhat muted. Reviewers welcomed the opportunity to view paintings by Schiele and Klimt, rarely seen in the UK, but expressed dismay at the way the exhibition was hung, that the order of works was not chronological, and over the paucity of information about the works and their sitters. Richard Dorment for The Daily Telegraph thought the show more of an illustrated lecture than an exhibition, while Jackie Wullschlager of The Financial Times called it a "heartbreaking missed opportunity". Adrian Searle of The Guardian thought the exhibition both "dizzying and depressing" but not an exhibition about great portraiture, as much about Vienna itself as its portraitists and sitters. His colleague Laura Cumming complained the show was frustratingly chaotic and observed it was most alive when depicting death. Brian Sewell of The Evening Standard shared concerns over the way the exhibition was organised, nevertheless welcomed the opportunity to view some lesser known names, although trenchant in his dismissal of Arnold Schönberg's work: "The most unwise of these excursions is the exaltation as artist-genius, even comparing him with Van Gogh, of the composer Arnold Schönberg, 26 and penniless in 1900, his crass amateur paintings "untainted" by training, deliberately naive – a folly equalled only by our acceptance, a century later, of Paul McCartney as a painter".

Rachel Campbell-Johnston for The Times (paywall), in a positive review, called the exhibition a complicated, probing, and philosophically fascinating show, exposing a society darkly sinister. Her colleague Nancy Durrant reviews Vienna itself, concluding (as did Adrian Searle) with Klimt's unfinished Portrait of Amalie Zuckerkandl:

 See also 
 Biedermeier
 Vienna Secession
 Ver Sacrum Wiener Werkstätte
 Miethke Gallery
 Austrian Association of Women Artists
 Ringstraße

 Citations 

 Bibliography 

 
 
 

 External links 
 Exhibition web page
 Guardian slide-show
 PDF issues of Ver Sacrum on the website of the Belvedere Museum  (Ver Sacrum'' was the in-house magazine of the Vienna Secession)
 Christie's sale of Klimt's Posthumous portrait of Ria Munk III (video)

Art exhibitions in London
2014 in London